Louis J. and Harriet Rozier House is a historic home located at De Soto, Jefferson County, Missouri.  It was built in 1887, and is a two-story, asymmetrical, Queen Anne style frame dwelling.  It sits on a rock-faced limestone foundation and has a hipped roof and lower cross gables.  It features a one-story wraparound porch, spindlework, and fishscale shingles.

It was listed on the National Register of Historic Places in 2006.

References 

Houses on the National Register of Historic Places in Missouri
Queen Anne architecture in Missouri
Houses completed in 1887
Buildings and structures in Jefferson County, Missouri
National Register of Historic Places in Jefferson County, Missouri